Zeile is a surname. Notable people with the surname include:

Elsie May Zeile (1885–1988), American botanist
Magnus Zeile (born 1968), Swedish tennis player
Todd Zeile (born 1965), American baseball player

See also
Zeiler
Zeiller